In organic chemistry, pentadienyl refers to the organic radical, anion, or cation with the formula , where z = 0, −1, +1, respectively.

Organometallic chemistry
In organometallic chemistry, the pentadienyl anion is a ligand, the acyclic analogue of the more-common cyclopentadienyl anion. The pentadienyl anion is generated by deprotonation of pentadiene. A number of complexes are known, including bis(pentadienyl) iron, the "open" analog of ferrocene. Only few pentadienyl complexes feature simple  ligands. More common is the dimethyl derivative 2,4-. Additionally, many pentadienyl ligands are cyclic, being derived from the addition of hydride to η6-arene complexes or hydride abstraction from cyclohexadiene complexes.

The first pentadienyl complex to be reported was derived from protonolysis of a complex of pentadienol:
Fe(C5H7OH)(CO)3 + H+ -> [Fe(C5H7)(CO)3]+ + H2O
Treatment of this cation with sodium borohydride gives the pentadiene complex:
[Fe(C5H7)(CO)3]+ + H- -> Fe(C5H8)(CO)3

Organic chemistry
In organic chemistry, the pentadienyl radical, is of some significance as an especially stabilized radical.  The radical is delocalized over five carbon centers. Consequently, the C−H bond in the diene (CH2(CH=CH2)) is especially weak. Fats derivatives containing this "doubly allylic" group are collectively called drying oils.  They tend to polymerize in a useful way upon exposure to air.

Biochemistry
Cyclooxygenases ("COX") are enzymes that generate prostanoids, including thromboxane and prostaglandins such as prostacyclin.  Aspirin and ibuprofen exert their effects through inhibition of COX.

References

Anions
Free radicals